Andy Miller (born 1 April 1982 in Galashiels) is a professional rugby player for Exeter Chiefs in the Aviva Premiership. His position of choice is Flanker.

References

External links

1982 births
Living people
Border Reivers players
Exeter Chiefs players
Rugby union players from Galashiels
Scotland 'A' international rugby union players
Scottish rugby union players
Rugby union flankers